With abundant water resources, Bangladesh faces various water contaminations mainly caused by pollutants, bacteria, and pesticides. Historically, water sources in Bangladesh came from surface water contaminated with bacteria. Drinking infected water resulted in infants and children suffering from acute gastrointestinal disease that led to a high mortality rate. According to UNICEF, 38.3% of Bangladeshis drink unsafe water from bacteria-contaminated sources. Bangladesh is facing an acute reliable drinking water scarcity. Bangladesh's surface and ground water are highly saline due to rising sea levels.

Available options for providing safe drinking water include deep wells, traditionally dug wells, treatment of surface water, and rainwater harvesting. Between 2000 and 2010, the government installed those safe water devices in arsenic-affected regions of Bangladesh. Between 2000 and 2012, the proportion of Bangladesh population who drink water with arsenic had decreased from 26.6% to 12.4%. There are 19.4 million Bangladeshis still drinking arsenic-contained water.

Bangladesh has a low level of cost recovery due to low tariffs and poor economic efficiency, especially in urban areas where revenues from water sales do not cover operating costs.

Only 56% of the population was estimated to have access to adequate sanitation facilities in 2010. But a new approach to improve sanitation coverage in rural areas, namely the community-led total sanitation concept, was introduced in Bangladesh and is credited for having contributed significantly to the increase in sanitation coverage.

Access 
In 2015, 87% of the population had access to "improved" water, and the figure was identical to rural and urban areas. In 2015, there were still around 21 million lacking access to "improved" water. Regarding sanitation, 61% of the total population had access to "improved" sanitation, or 58% and 62%, in urban and rural areas, respectively.

Since arsenic was discovered in Bangladeshi groundwater in 1993, the share of population with access to safe drinking water had to be adjusted downward. According to the Joint Monitoring Program for Water Supply and Sanitation of UNICEF and the World Health Organization (WHO), access to an improved source of water supply increased only slightly from 77% in 1990 to 81% in 2010, whereas coverage of improved sanitation increased from 39% to 46% during the same period.

Estimates of access to an improved source of water supply is greatly affected by the presence of arsenic in groundwater, which is estimated to affect 27% of all wells and is subtracted from the figures obtained by solely measuring the level of access to infrastructure. Without taking into account the presence of arsenic, 99% of the urban population and 97% of the rural population actually had access to an improved source of water supply according to the Demographic and Health Survey of 2004, which is an unusually high level of access for a low-income country. In urban areas, access is broken down as follows:

 23% piped inside dwelling
 8% piped outside dwelling
 68% tubewells

In rural areas the breakdown is:

 Less than 0.6% piped inside and outside dwelling
 96% tubewells
 1% dug wells
 More than 2% ponds, lakes and rivers

Rainwater harvesting, although practised in Bangladesh, was not included in the survey. The official figures of the Joint Monitoring Program, taking into account the presence of arsenic, are as follows:

 
In 2005, the Bangladeshi Minister for Local Government and Rural Development presented a National Sanitation Strategy that ambitiously aimed to reach universal access to sanitation by 2010. Without mentioning community-led total sanitation by name (see under innovative approaches below), the strategy incorporates important elements of this approach, such as an emphasis on participation by the whole community and the principle of not subsidising hardware except for the "hardcore poor".

Service quality

Continuity of supply
Among 11 cities participating in performance benchmarking in 2006–07, none provided water continuously to all customers. According to the benchmarking data, the city with the shortest supply per day was Bagerhat with 2 hours and the city with the longest supply was Dhaka with 23 hours, followed by Manikganj and Chandpur with 20 hours. Within cities, the duration of supply often varies, as it does between seasons. Major water shortages in Bangladesh occur during the dry season. As of 2011, however, intermittent supply was common in at least parts of Dhaka, forcing families to purchase drinking water and use pond or river water for their other needs. Regular power cuts, which turn off well pumps, also contribute to the intermittency of supply.

Wastewater treatment
In Dhaka, nearly one third of domestic effluents do not receive any kind of treatment. About 30% of the served population of the Dhaka Water Supply and Sewerage Authority (DWASA) is covered by a sewerage system, the only one in the entire country. There is one sewage treatment plant with a capacity of 120,000 m³ per day. About 30% of the population uses conventional septic tanks and another 15% uses bucket and pit latrines. During the rainy season, sewage overflows are common.

Water resources

Availability of water resources
Bangladesh has an enormous excess of surface water during the summer monsoon (June to October) and relative scarcity towards the end of the dry season in April and May. Internal renewable water resources are about 105 km3 per year, while inflowing transboundary rivers provide another 1,100 km3 annually (average 1977–2001). Bangladesh heavily depends on the flow of the Brahmaputra, Meghna and Ganges river basins that originate in India, Nepal and China. Whereas deforestation and flood control in the upstream catchment areas increase the flood peaks in Bangladesh, water withdrawals and water diversions may result in water shortages in the dry season. The Ganges Water Sharing Treaty between India and Bangladesh, signed in 1996, allows Bangladesh to receive a minimum amount of  during the dry season.

Sources of drinking water
In rural areas, more than 97% of the population relies on groundwater for its drinking water supply. In Dhaka, 82% of the water supply is extracted from groundwater that is free of arsenic, while three surface water treatment plants provide the remaining 18%. Groundwater is being severely depleted in Dhaka where the groundwater levels are dropping at two to three metres every year. The city's water table has sunk by 50 metres in the past four decades and the closest in the near South Africa underground water is now over 60 meters below ground level. The Asian Development Bank estimated in 2007 that by 2015 a severe supply shortage would occur if the utility did not reduce groundwater extraction.

Arsenic contamination of groundwater
During the 1970s, UNICEF worked with the Department of Public Health Engineering to install tube-wells. Tube-wells draw water from underground aquifers to provide a safe source of water for the nation. As of 2010, 67% of Bangladeshis had a permanent water source and a majority of them used tube wells.

The wells consist of tubes 5 cm in diameter inserted less than 200 m into the ground and capped with an iron or steel hand pump. At that time, standard water testing procedures did not include arsenic testing. This lack of precaution led to one of the largest mass poisoning of a population because the ground water used for drinking was contaminated with arsenic. In 1993 it was discovered that groundwater in large parts of Bangladesh was naturally contaminated with arsenic. An astonishing number of people in Bangladesh, possibly numbering up to 58 million people, were exposed to and were continually consuming the water poisoned by arsenic from around the year 1990 through 2000. After the revelation that arsenic was poisoning the peoples’ water sources, it was brought to light that roughly 90% of the Bangladesh population was exposed to it on some level. Intervention measures such as awareness programs and the painting of tube-wells red if the water is above the government limit of 50 ppb arsenic (green otherwise) have been effective in preventing further poisoning.

The WHO estimated in 2000 that between 35 and 77 million of the 125 million Bangladeshis were at risk of drinking contaminated water. In an interview published by the WHO in 2008, Professor Mahmuder Rahman quoted government estimates saying that up to 70 million people still drink water which exceeds the WHO guidelines of 10 micrograms per litre of arsenic, and 30 million drink water containing more than the Bangladesh National Standard of 50 micrograms per litre. Alternative sources of water are deep-tube wells that pump uncontaminated groundwater, surface
water, rainwater harvesting and pond sand filters. According to the 2006 Multiple Indicator Cluster Survey, just over half of the people surveyed (55 per cent) indicated that they use arsenic-free tube wells, 21 per cent reported using boiled surface water (from canals, ponds and rivers), 5 per cent rely on rainwater and 2.4 per cent use pond sand filters. The UN Rapporteur on the human right to water and sanitation was told in 2009 that the main government strategy to provide alternative water sources were deep tube wells, not increased use of surface water, as stated in the 2004 government strategy. The government sells four types of household-level arsenic filters through a "Deployment of Arsenic Removal Technologies" (DART) Programme supported by CIDA. The four filters are the Sono arsenic filter, the Alcan Enhanced Activated Alumina filter, the Bangladesh University of Engineering and Technology (BUET) Activated Alumina filter and the Stevens Institute of Technology filter. Until 2008, nearly 18,000 household filters and 50
community filters have been installed under the DART programme alone. Through the programme, individuals can buy the filters for between 3,500 and 5,000 takas (US$50–70). For the very poorest, the filters are available at 10 per cent of the full price. Nevertheless, some people cannot afford filters and continue to drink arsenic-contaminated water. Other programs distribute filters for free. For example, of 32,500 Sono filters installed until 2008, two-thirds were distributed for free. In 2016 a report by Human Rights Watch noted that the government has failed to address the issue of arsenic contamination adequately due to "nepotism and neglect" so that 20 million people still drink water with higher than permissible arsenic levels.

Water use
Only about 15 km³ annually, or about 1% of total water resources, is being withdrawn for human use. Out of the total withdrawals, 86% is for agriculture, 12% for domestic water supply and 2% for industry. It is predicted that Bangladesh's population will increase from 129 million people in 2000 to 181 million by 2025 and 224 million by 2050, accompanied by an increased demand for water.

Piped water supply, as estimated by the utility, was about 100 litres per capita per day in Dhaka in 2007 for those with access to piped water supply. This amount is slightly less than per capita water use in Germany. Given the low share of metering, estimates of per capita water use are not reliable. In a sample of 11 cities, 8 did not have any customer metering at all. In Dhaka and Chittagong, 70 and 86 percent of customers were metered. In the city of Rajshahi, which has no metering, the municipal utility estimated per capita water use at 98 litres per capita per day. However, a customer satisfaction survey carried out together with the NGO Forum on Drinking Water Supply and Sanitation carried out among 600 respondents in 2008 found that the average was only 78 litres. Water use varied significantly depending on income, with the poor consuming 43 litres and the poorest only 28 litres. The survey also showed that half the respondents drank water straight from the tap without filtering or boiling it, while 27% rated the water quality as poor. The estimated amount of water consumed varies significantly between cities. For example, in 2006–07 it was estimated at more than 250 litres in Manikganj, but at only 33 litres in Chapai Nawabganj and Gazipur. The average for 11 cities was 88 litres.

History and recent developments

The country's national water policy was mainly focused on agricultural issues and was aimed at food self-sufficiency. Accordingly, flood control drainage and irrigation projects were the most common measures. In the 1990s the necessity of a more comprehensive approach was recognised, leading to the formulation of a National Water Policy.

History
The first central institution in the water sector in what is now Bangladesh was the East Pakistan Water and Power Development Agency (EPWAPDA), created in 1959 to plan, construct and operate all water development schemes. In 1964, EPWAPDA, with the assistance of the United States development agency USAID, prepared a 20-year Water Master Plan, including flood control. Although infrastructure was constructed, the lack of operation and maintenance, among other things, soon led to its deterioration.

After the independence from Pakistan in 1971, EPWAPDA was restructured and renamed the Bangladesh Water Development Board. The new republic soon gained support from several agencies. The World Bank published the Land and Water Sector Study in 1972, advocating small-scale flood control and irrigation projects. As a result, small-scale irrigation spread quickly during the 1970s and 1980s, partly financed by the private sector.

In light of the growing population and the expanding agricultural and industrial sectors, in 1983 the National Water Resources Council (NWRC) was founded and the newly created Master Plan Organization (MPO) started to draw up a comprehensive National Water Plan (NWP). The first phase of the NWP was completed in 1986 and included an assessment of available water resources and future demand. According to the Asian Development Bank (ADB), a lack of attention to intersectoral and environmental issues led the national government to reject the plan. Consequently, the second phase of the NWP was drawn up from 1987 to 1991, including an estimate of the available groundwater and surface water as well as a draft water law. The draft also took into account environmental needs. In 1991, the MPO was restructured and renamed the Water Resources Planning Organization (WARPO).

Two destructive floods in 1987 and 1988 were followed by increased international attention and assistance. In 1989, several studies were prepared by the United Nations Development Fund (UNDO) and national agencies from France, the United States, Japan, and others. The World Bank coordinated the donor activities. At the end of the year, the Flood Action Plan (FAP) was approved by the national government of Bangladesh. However, according to Chadwick the plan was criticised by some donors and civil society. The planned participation of civil society was hampered by the military dictatorship that governed the country at that time. Later, the national government approved the FAP's final report, called the Bangladesh Water and Flood Management Strategy (BWFMS), in 1995 with the support of donor agencies. Among other things, the strategy proposed the formulation of a comprehensive national water management plan, increased user participation and environmental impact assessment as integral parts of planning. Consequently, the Flood Planning Coordination Organization (FPCO), which had been established in 1992 to co-ordinate the studies, was merged with WARPO in 1996.

National Water Policy and related policies
In 1999, on the recommendation of the World Bank and after extensive consultation with all relevant actors, including NGOs and the civil society, the National Water Policy (NWP) was adopted. The document explicitly states 6 main objectives:
 To address the use and development of groundwater and surface water in an efficient and equitable way
 To ensure the availability of water to all parts of the society
 To accelerate the development of public and private water systems through legal and financial measures and incentives, including appropriate water rights and water pricing rules
 To formulate institutional changes, encouraging decentralisation and enhancing the role of women in water management
 To provide a legal and regulatory framework which encourages decentralisation, consideration of environmental impacts, and private sector investment
 To develop knowledge and capability to facilitate improved future water resources management plans to encourage, among other things, broad user participation

Furthermore, WARPO has developed a National Water Management Plan (NWMP), which was approved by NWRC in 2004 and aims at implementing the NWP within 25 years. It is expected to be reviewed and updated every five years. In 2005, the national government included the improvement of water supply and sanitation as part of its agenda for reducing poverty.

Complementing the National Water Policy, the government adopted the National Policy for Safe Water Supply and Sanitation in 1998.  
In 2004 it also adopted a National Policy for Arsenic Mitigation in 2004. The policy emphasises public awareness, alternative safe water supply, proper diagnosis and management of patients, and capacity building. In terms of alternative supplies it gives "preference to surface water over groundwater". The latter aspect is controversial, since surface water is often highly contaminated with pathogens while deeper groundwater is often safe and free of arsenic.

Innovative approaches 
A number of innovative approaches to improve access to and the sustainability of water supply and sanitation were developed in Bangladesh since the turn of the millennium. These include community-led total sanitation and new management models for piped rural water supply, both further described below.

In addition, innovative pilot projects were initiated in Dhaka. The first provided water to hitherto unserved slum areas through community-based organisations with the assistance of the NGO Dushtha Shasthya Kendra (DSK) and WaterAid from the UK. The second is a pilot for a small-bore sewer system in the Mirpur area of Dhaka with financing from the Asian Development Bank. A third project involved contracting out billing and collection to a woker's cooperative as an alternative to private sector participation.

Community-led total sanitation 
In 2000 a new approach to increasing sanitation coverage, called community-led total sanitation (CLTS), was first introduced in Bangladesh in a small village in the Rajshahi District by Dr. Kamal Kar in co-operation with WaterAid Bangladesh and the Village Education Resource Centre (VERC).

Until then, most traditional sanitation programs relied on the provision of subsidies for the construction of latrines and hygiene education. Under this framework, the subsidised facilities were expensive and often did not reach all members of a community. In addition, the subsidies may have reduced the feeling of personal responsibility for the toilets.

These perceived shortcomings led to the development of the CLTS approach in Bangladesh, shifting the focus on personal responsibility and low-cost solutions. CLTS aims to totally stop open defecation within a community rather than facilitating improved sanitation only to selected households. Awareness of local sanitation issues is raised through a walk to open defecation areas and water points (walk of shame) and a calculation of the amount of excreta caused by open defecation. Combined with hygiene education, the approach aims to make the entire community realise the severe health impacts of open defecation. Since individual carelessness may affect the entire community, pressure on each person becomes stronger to follow sanitation principles such as using sanitary toilets, washing hands, and practising good hygiene. To introduce sanitation even in the poorest households, low-cost toilets are promoted, constructed with local materials. The purchase of the facility is not subsidised, so that every household must finance its own toilets.

In 2006, the number of villages with total sanitation was estimated at more than 5,000 throughout the country. At the same time, CLTS had spread in at least six countries in Asia and three in Africa. In 2009, the UN Special Rapporteur for the human right to water and sanitation noted that "the experience of Bangladesh (with CLTS) has positively influenced countries in other regions of the world and has instilled confidence in the belief that low-cost sanitation is possible. It has also had a powerful effect in breaking the taboo that often surrounds the issue of sanitation. The independent expert observed that most people with whom she met, including the Prime Minister, were pleased, and even proud, to discuss sanitation and the achievements of Bangladesh in this domain." However, she also noted "concerns (...) about a lack of monitoring of continued latrine usage, maintenance of latrines and overreporting of sanitation coverage".

New management models for piped rural water supply 
Deep tubewells with electric pumps are common as source of water supply for irrigation in Bangladesh. The government had long been interested in making the operation of these tubewells more financially viable. One option considered was to increase revenues by selling water from deep tubewells as drinking water and for small-scale commercial operations, thus at the same time addressing the arsenic crisis. Also, the government was interested in developing new management models beyond pure community management to both mobilise funding and improve the quality and sustainability of service provision. To that effect two parallel innovative approaches have been pursued.

Rural Development Academy multipurpose schemes. These efforts to combine piped drinking water and irrigation schemes were initiated in 1999 by the Rural Development Academy (RDA) with government funds and no donor involvement. RDA invited sponsors and offered to finance the construction of the well and the water supply system under the condition that:

 the sponsors from the community would create a water user association (samitee),
 pay for 10% of the investment costs at the time of completion of the construction,
 operate and maintain the system for 10 years, and
 pay back the remaining 90% of the investment costs over this period.

As of January 2008, 73 small schemes had been completed, both in areas where the shallow aquifer is contaminated by arsenic and those where this is not the case. Sponsors are NGOs, cooperatives or individuals. The number of applicants each year outnumbers the schemes to be constructed. However, tariffs have been set at relatively low levels, so that the operators barely break even and have not paid back the loans for 90% of the investment costs. Revenues from irrigation typically account for a third of the revenues of the water schemes, the remainder coming from the sale of drinking water.

Bangladesh Water Supply Program Project. Another approach has been supported by the World Bank through the Bangladesh Water Supply Program Project (BWSPP), implemented by the Department of Public Health and Engineering (DPHE). This approach, initiated in 2001, has been inspired by the RDA experience, but with two crucial modifications: First, it required sponsors to come up with the entire financing up-front, which was supposed to be recovered through revenues from the sale of water. Second, only drinking water was to be provided and no irrigation water. Finding sponsors willing to put their own capital at risk proved to be difficult.  For this reason, and due to project management difficulties, only two schemes had been built as of January 2008, providing water to 2,000 households. Neither scheme has become financially viable. An NGO built and operates the schemes, since no private company was interested in doing so.

Responsibility for water supply and sanitation
According to a 2009 report by the UN Special Rapporteur on the human right to water and sanitation after a visit to Bangladesh, there is "an overall lack of monitoring and accountability" and "corruption continues to plague the sector". She also notes that standardised reporting processes and performance indicators to monitor utility performance were missing and that "there is no independent and effective regulation of the water supply and sanitation sector", making it next to impossible to ensure compliance with the numerous laws and policies in place. According to the UN report, the activities of the different ministries, the departments within the Ministry of Local Government, Rural Development and water supply and sewerage authorities need to be better coordinated.

The government has adopted policies that could remedy the challenges in the sector. These include the National Policies for Safe Water Supply and Sanitation, National Water Management Plan, the National Policy for Arsenic Mitigation which gives preference to surface water over groundwater and the National Sanitation Strategy of 2005. These policies emphasize decentralization, user participation, the role of women, and appropriate pricing rules.

Policy and regulation
Numerous ministries in Bangladesh have responsibilities relating to water and sanitation services. The Ministry of Local Government, Rural Development and Cooperatives has overall responsibility for monitoring and governing the sector, including policy formulation through its Local Government Division. Within the Division, the Department of Public Health Engineering (DPHE) assists municipalities and communities in building water supply infrastructure in all parts of the country, except for the three largest urban areas, Dhaka, Khulna and Chittagong. Other ministries with competencies in the areas of water and sanitation include those of education, health and family welfare; water resources; environment and forests; finance; and the Planning Commission. The National Water Management Plan (NWMP) lists not less than 13 ministries involved in the sector.

Concerning water resources management, the National Water Resources Council (NWRC) chaired by the Prime Minister formulates policies and oversees their implementation. The Water Resources Planning Organization (WARPO) under the Ministry of Water Resources acts as Secretariat of the Executive Committee.

Service provision

Water Supply and Sewerage Authorities 
Water supply and sanitation in the three largest cities is carried out by semi-autonomous municipal utilities. In the cities of Dhaka, Chittagong and Khulna, the semi-autonomous Dhaka Water Supply and Sewerage Authority (DWASA), the Chittagong Water Supply and Sewerage Authority (CWASA) and the Khulna Water Supply and Sewerage Authority (KWASA) provide water for domestic, industrial, and commercial consumption as well as sewerage and stormwater drainage. KWASA was only established in 2008, while the two other utilities are older.

Municipalities
Bangladesh is subdivided into 328 municipalities (Paurashavas). Outside of Dhaka, Chittagong and Khulna, each municipality is directly responsible for its own water supply, sewerage, and storm drainage. They are empowered to charge tariffs and receive assistance from the Department of Public Health Engineering (DPHE), which is responsible for waterworks development projects as well as planning in the rural water sector and all urban areas except for the three largest cities. Once the projects are completed, the facilities are handed over to the municipalities.

Private sector and NGOs
In addition to government institutions, non-governmental organisations (NGOs) and the private sector are involved in the provision of services and are acknowledged within the institutional sector framework in the NWMP. The improvement of the investment climate for the private sector is included in the six main objectives of the document. However, private sector participation in the Bangladeshi water supply and sanitation sector remains limited to small businesses. According to Das Gupta, direct private investment is almost non-existent. The NWMP recognises that large-scale private participation remains a challenge.

Other functions
The Joint Rivers Commission (JRC) under the Ministry of Water Resources has the main function of working on transboundary water issues together with the other riparian countries. Environmental standards are set and enforced by the Department of Environment. The Bangladesh Water Development Board (BWDB) is responsible for the implementation of water projects that exceed 10 km² in size, whereas the Local Government Engineering Department (LGED) is entrusted with smaller projects. The Rajdhani Unnayan Kartipakkha, Bangladesh's capital development authority, is in charge of urban development and setting building codes in Dhaka.

Efficiency of utilities
There is little reliable quantitative information available concerning the performance of Bangladeshi water and sewer utilities, including on their efficiency. Beginning in 2005, the first systematic performance benchmarking for water and sewer utilities in Bangladesh was initiated by the World Bank's Water and sanitation program as part of a regional project that also covered India and Pakistan, covering 11 utilities in Bangladesh. The benchmarking project found that data were not very reliable, that benchmarking was "largely externally driven than internally motivated" and that the organizational culture of utilities was "often slow to accept performance measurement, accountability to customers and to government, and improved service outcomes." Two common indicators of the efficiency of utilities are non-revenue water and labour productivity. According to these indicators, the efficiency of Bangladeshi utilities is poor, despite some recent improvements.

In Dhaka, the share of non-revenue water (NRW) has been substantially reduced from 54% in 2003 to 29% in 2010. Concerning municipalities, the ADB estimates NRW at 33–40%. Labor productity was low, with staffing levels averaging 9 per 1,000 connections and ranging from 7–15 compared to a good practice of less than 5. In 2006–07 the ratio was more than 12 staff per 1,000 connections for Dhaka and 15 in Chittagong.

Financial aspects

Tariffs and cost recovery
The National Water Master Plan provides for the gradual increase of tariffs to fully recover the costs of service provision in urban areas using an increasing block tariff structure. In rural areas, the tariffs should cover at least all operation and maintenance costs. Since this framework is not yet implemented, municipalities or water utilities have the right to set their own tariffs controlled by the government.

Dhaka The average tariff in Dhaka was US$0.08 per m³ in 2007. Those connected to sewerage had to pay double. Connection fees were between US$29 and US$60, according to the diameter of the pipe. Despite the extremely low tariff, the utility recovered more than its operating cost.

Other urban areas Cost recovery varies between cities. In a sample of 11 utilities, the operating ratio averaged 0.89. In principle, this indicates that on average operating costs were covered, but because of unreliable data it is not sure if this is actually true. The water tariff was on average 4.38 Takas per cubic meter (US$0.06), the lowest one being 2.11 Takas (0.03) in Rajshahi, the highest one being 6.89 Takas (US$0.09) in Chittagong.

Rural areas. Tariffs in rural areas vary. In piped multi-purpose schemes supported by RDA households pay a flat fee equivalent to about US$1.20 per month for drinking water and a flat fee equivalent to US$72/season/hectare for irrigation. Revenues from these tariffs allow to recover operation and maintenance costs.

Investment and financing
Investment. Water and sanitation are not the subject of a separate budget line, but spread over the budgets of different institutions, which makes it difficult to assess how much government funding is spent on water and sanitation, and for what purposes. In the Annual Development Programme (ADP) of the Bangladeshi Planning Commission, the government's development investment in water supply and sanitation ranged between US$50 million and US$101 million from fiscal years 1994–1995 to 2000–2001.

From 1994–1995 to 2000–2001, the water resources subsector, including flood control and irrigation received much more funding than the water supply and sanitation sector, which is shown above. On average, US$74 million or US$0.55 per capita have been spent per year. In 1996–1997, the investment for water resources was more than almost four times as high as the amount provided for water supply and sanitation. From 1973 to 1990, the share of development expenditures for water supply and sanitation decreased gradually in the respective five-year plans. In the first one, it was 2.48% of development investment, dropping to 2.14% and 1.25% in the second and third five-year plans, respectively. In the fourth plan, the allocation increased slightly to 1.41% of the budget.

According to an ADB document comparing water supply in major Asian cities, DWASA's capital expenditure was US$26 million or US$3.51 per user in 2001.

Rural areas According to an evaluation by the Danish Ministry of Foreign Affairs, 30% of the rural water supply and sanitation in Bangladesh is financed by the national government, whereas 34% comes from bilateral and multilateral donors and another 4% from international and local NGOS. The users contribute the remaining 32%, a remarkable share compared to other countries evaluated in the study, such as Ghana, Egypt or Benin.

Financing. Many cities rely on development grants by the central government. In small urban water supply systems, property taxes are used to mobilise local resources. Funding can also be obtained from the Municipal Development Fund. External funding is also common (see section on external donors).

External co-operation
Several external donors have been active in the sector for decades. Concerning urban water supply and sanitation, the Government of Bangladesh and the following donors signed a partnership framework in November 2007: Asian Development Bank (ADB), Danish International Development Assistance (DANIDA), the Government of Japan, the Government of the Republic of Korea, and the World Bank.

The main objectives of the framework are to co-operate to extend the coverage of water, sanitation, wastewater, and drainage services in Dhaka and Chittagong, especially to the poor, and to address long-standing reforms. Under the common partnership framework, all donors carry out individual projects in urban areas. However, the five donors and the Government of Bangladesh have agreed upon general strategies and necessary policy actions as well as an exchange of progress information.

Asian Development Bank (ADB)
By 2003, the ADB had provided 19 loans amounting to nearly US$700 million in the Bangladeshi water management sector. Under the partnership framework, the bank provides a program loan of US$50 million and a project loan of US$150 million within the Dhaka Water Supply Sector Development Program, approved in April 2008. The former loan aims to support reforms in the urban water supply and sanitation sector, including the strengthening of local institutions and the structure of DWASA, the preparation of a sector strategy and plan and the improving of financial sustainability. The project loan comprises physical investment to rehabilitate and optimise DWASA's distribution network and improve the quality of the services provided, as well as a capacity building and institutional strengthening component, and project management and implementation support. The program and the project, which are both accompanied by technical assistance, are expected to be completed at the end of 2013.

Denmark 
From 1997 to 2009 Danida supported the Coastal Belt which promoted rural and small towns water supply, sanitation and hygiene promotion in the coastal regions of Bangladesh, which built 30,000 arsenic-free deep hand tube wells and promoted the construction of over 300,000 household latrines.

World Bank

Rural areas 
Bangladesh Water Supply Program Project The World Bank is contributing a US$40 million loan to the Bangladesh Water Supply Program Project, designed to support Bangladesh in achieving the MDGs in water supply and sanitation by 2015 through safe water free from arsenic and pathogens in small towns and rural areas. Private-sector participation in rural areas as well as in municipalities is promoted. In small arsenic-affected villages, measures are introduced to mitigate arsenic. The project is accompanied by a monitoring and evaluation system. Furthermore, adequate regulations, monitoring, capacity building, and training, as well as the development of a local credit market and risk mitigation mechanisms for village piped water supply are supported under the project. It began in 2004 and will likely end in 2010.

Arsenic Mitigation Water Supply Project This project, supported by a US$44.4 million credit and implemented from 1998 to 2006, aimed at "reducing mortality and morbidity in rural and urban populations caused by arsenic contamination of groundwater using
sustainable water supply, health, and water management strategies." The project focused primarily on deep tubewells as an alternative to shallow tubewells contaminated with arsenic. It supported the drilling of 9,772 deep tubewells, 300 rainwater harvesting systems and 393 dug wells in more than 1,800 villages, all of which operated and maintained by communities and benefiting between 2 and 2.5 million people. The project was implemented by the Department of Public Health Engineering (DPEH) of MOLGRDC.

Urban areas
Dhaka Water Supply and Sanitation Project. Under the partnership framework, the World Bank approved in 2008 a US$149 million loan to assist DWASA, the utility serving Dhaka. The project will finance sewers, the rehabilitation and expansion of the Pagla wastewater treatment plant, and stormwater drainage., after a six-year hiatus since the closure of the Fourth Dhaka water supply project.

 Fourth Dhaka Water Supply Project The Fourth Dhaka Water Supply Project was carried out from 1996 to 2002. The World Bank contributed US$80.3 million. It was launched to "support institutional reforms in the sector, applying commercial principles and increasing private sector participation". The existing infrastructure was rehabilitated and a water treatment plant was constructed in Saidabad, producing 225 million litres per day. Private sector participation and the application of commercial principles were limited to the introduction of outsourcing of billing and collection in two revenue zones. Furthermore, a managing director with a private sector background was appointed to manage DWASA.

The Chittagong water supply and sanitation improvement project, a US$170 million loan approved in 2010, supports the construction of two water treatment plants and water distribution systems in Chittagong.

See also
 Water management in Dhaka

Notes and references

Notes

References

External links

Institutions 
 Ministry of Local Government, Rural Development and Cooperatives:Local Government Division
 Local Consultative Group: [Water Supply and Sanitation https://web.archive.org/web/20180315001709/http://lcgbangladesh.org/WaterSupply%26Sanitation.php?q=1&s=23]
 Dhaka Water Supply and Sewerage Authority (DWASA)
 Water Resources Planning Organization (WARPO)
Water Treatment Plant Supplier in Cheapest Cost : Water Logic BD

Documents and reports 
 Asadullah Khan in The Daily Star:The looming water crisis, 16 May 2009